Everfound may refer to:
 Everfound (novel), a 2011 novel by Neal Shusterman
 Everfound (band), a Christian pop-rock band
 Everfound (album), the band's eponymous album